St Sylvester's is a Gaelic Athletic Association club based in Malahide, Fingal, Ireland. The club was founded in 1903 and last won the Dublin Senior Football Championship in 1996. The club plays hurling and Gaelic football.

Barney Rock was the club's manager in 2000.

Notable players

Senior inter-county men's footballers
 Dublin
 Keith Galvin
 John Leonard
 Down
Declan Rooney
 Louth
 Darren Clarke
 Benny Gaughran
 Galway
 Niall Finnegan

Senior inter-county ladies' footballers
 Dublin
 Sinéad Aherne
 Niamh McEvoy

Achievements
 Dublin Senior Football Championship: 1996
 Leinster Senior Club Football Championship: Runners-Up 1996-97
 Dublin Junior Football Championship: 1989, 1963, 1939
 Dublin Junior B Football Championship Winner 1999, 2014
 Dublin Junior D Football Championship Winner 2009, 2022
 Dublin Minor Football Championship: 1992, 2000, 2001
 Dublin AFL Division 1: 2010
 Dublin AFL Division 2: 2022
 Dublin AFL Div. 7 Winner 2012
 Dublin AFL Div. 10 Winner 2018
 Dublin Junior Hurling Championship: 2009
 Leinster Special Junior Hurling Championship Winners (1) 2009
 Dublin Intermediate Hurling Championship: 2012
 Dublin Under 21 B Football Championship: 2016
 Dublin Under 19 C Football Championship: 2022
 Dublin Under 21 C Hurling Championship Winner 2017
 Dublin Minor C Hurling Championship Winners 2011

References

External links
Official Club Website

Gaelic games clubs in Fingal
Malahide